Kalabo Airport  is an airport serving the town of Kalabo, in Kalabo District and surrounding communities in the Western Province of Zambia.

Location
The geographical coordinates of Kalabo Airport are:
14°59'55.0"S, 22°38'50.0"E (Latitude:-14.998611; Longitude:22.647222).

Overview
Kalabo Airport as a single paved runway 10/28 that measures  in length.

Airlines and destinations

See also

Transport in Zambia
List of airports in Zambia

References

External links
List of Airports and Airfields in Zambia

Airports in Zambia
Buildings and structures in Western Province, Zambia